The 31st Curtis Cup Match was played on 24 and 25 June 2000 at Ganton Golf Club in Ganton, North Yorkshire, England. The United States won 10 to 8.

Format
The contest was a two-day competition, with three foursomes and six singles matches on each day, a total of 18 points.

Each of the 18 matches was worth one point in the larger team competition. If a match was all square after the 18th hole extra holes were not played. Rather, each side earned  a point toward their team total. The team that accumulated at least 9 points won the competition. In the event of a tie, the current holder retained the Cup.

Teams
Eight players for Great Britain & Ireland and USA participated in the event plus one non-playing captain for each team.

Saturday's matches

Morning foursomes

Afternoon singles

Sunday's matches

Morning foursomes

Afternoon singles

References

Curtis Cup
Golf tournaments in England
International sports competitions hosted by England
Sport in North Yorkshire
Curtis Cup
Curtis Cup
Curtis Cup
Ganton